Grevillea endlicheriana, commonly known as spindly grevillea, is a species of flowering plant in the family Proteaceae and is endemic to the south-west of Western Australia. It is an erect shrub with linear  leaves, and groups of white, pink tinged flowers.

Description
Both surfaces of the leaves are covered with silky hairs.

Taxonomy
Grevillea endlicheriana was first formally described in 1845 by Carl Meissner in Plantae Preissianae, based on plant material collected from the Darling Scarp in 1839. The specific epithet (endlicheriana) honours Stephan Endlicher.

Distribution and habitat
Spindly grevillea grows in woodland or shrubland between Mogumber and Kelmscott with a disjunct population near Wongan Hills, in the Avon Wheatbelt, Jarrah Forest, Mallee and Swan Coastal Plain biogeographic regions of south-western Western Australia.

Conservation status
This grevillea is listed as "not threatened" by the Western Australian Government Department of Biodiversity, Conservation and Attractions.

References

endlicheriana
Endemic flora of Western Australia
Eudicots of Western Australia
Proteales of Australia
Taxa named by Carl Meissner
Plants described in 1845